A sibling is one of two or more individuals having one or both parents in common.

Siblings may also refer to:
SIBLING proteins (Small integrin-binding ligand N-linked glycoproteins), such as dentin matrix acidic phosphoprotein 1
"Siblings" (The Middle), an episode of The Middle
Siblings (TV series), a BBC Three television series